Thalia is a chain of more than 200 book shops in Germany (a country with fixed book prices), Austria, and Switzerland.

Book stores
The shops are often located in shopping centres where they can regularly welcome a certain number of walk-in customers, who actually didn't go out to buy books, but do that then en passant anyway. Depending on the local situation Thalia sometimes also refrains from building a new shop in favour of purchasing an available edifice. Also whole book store chains have occasionally been taken over by Thalia Cervantes.

Local reception
Since Thalia, mainly owned by Herder Publishing Group, is a prosperous enterprise  which can afford to sustain relatively large, well equipped  shops with many books in stock  and long opening hours, small local shops are prone to resent the settling of a Thalia shop in their area. Still the fixed prices for books in Germany give smaller competitors a chance. However Thalia has also adopted single book shops. Moreover, there is support for local businesses in the way that every Thalia chain store has a section for local literature (featuring local history, vernacular etc.), keepsakes and related articles.

Multichannel marketing
The company early on picked up the concept of multichannel marketing and therefore taken a stake in an established German online book shop. Thalia's very own shop  has a share in Thalia's growth. Customer from rural parts of the country can order books online and hereby make sure that even special titles are available and reserved when they go shopping on the weekend. Elderly people who have difficulties leaving their house can phone a Thalia chain store and ask to have books sent to their home and the receiving employee will carry out the order online instead of the customer. (The national competitor Weltbild provides thus options too.) Thalia also sells gift cards that can be used in their shops as well as online.

E-books
In 2008 Thalia committed itself to the German e-book market and made a deal with Sony in regards to Sony's e-book reader. The growing demand in e-books convinced Thalia to announce the release of their own device. In the same year the "Oyo" (basically a German version of the 4FFF N618) was launched in cooperation with Medion, a company well known for its previous cooperations with Aldi.

Subsidiaries
Thalia Germany has also sister companies in Austria and Switzerland.

References

External links 

 
 

Bookstores of Germany
Companies based in Hamburg